In probability theory and statistics, the Weibull distribution  is a continuous probability distribution.

Definition

Standard parameterization

The probability density function of a Weibull random variable is 

where k > 0 is the shape parameter and λ > 0 is the scale parameter of the distribution. Its complementary cumulative distribution function is a stretched exponential function. The Weibull distribution is related to a number of other probability distributions; in particular, it interpolates between the exponential distribution (k = 1) and the Rayleigh distribution (k = 2 and ).

If the quantity X is a "time-to-failure", the Weibull distribution gives a distribution for which the failure rate is proportional to a power of time. The shape parameter, k, is that power plus one, and so this parameter can be interpreted directly as follows:

 A value of  indicates that the failure rate decreases over time (like in case of the Lindy effect, which however corresponds to Pareto distributions rather than Weibull distributions). This happens if there is significant "infant mortality", or defective items failing early and the failure rate decreasing over time as the defective items are weeded out of the population. In the context of the diffusion of innovations, this means negative word of mouth: the hazard function is a monotonically decreasing function of the proportion of adopters; 
 A value of   indicates that the failure rate is constant over time. This might suggest random external events are causing mortality, or failure. The Weibull distribution reduces to an exponential distribution; 
 A value of  indicates that the failure rate increases with time. This happens if there is an "aging" process, or parts that are more likely to fail as time goes on. In the context of the diffusion of innovations, this means positive word of mouth: the hazard function is a monotonically increasing function of the proportion of adopters.

In the field of materials science, the shape parameter k of a distribution of strengths is known as the Weibull modulus. In the context of diffusion of innovations, the Weibull distribution is a "pure" imitation/rejection model.

Alternative parameterizations

First alternative
Applications in medical statistics and econometrics often adopt a different parameterization. In this case, for x ≥ 0, the probability density function is

the cumulative distribution function is 

the hazard function is

and the mean is

Second alternative
A second alternative parameterization can also be found. The shape parameter k is the same as in the standard case, while the scale parameter λ is replaced with a rate parameter β = 1/λ. Then, for x ≥ 0, the probability density function is

the cumulative distribution function is 

and the hazard function is

In all three parameterizations, the hazard is decreasing for k < 1, increasing for k > 1 and constant for k = 1, in which case the Weibull distribution reduces to an exponential distribution.

Properties

Density function

The form of the density function of the Weibull distribution changes drastically with the value of k. For 0 < k < 1, the density function tends to ∞ as x approaches zero from above and is strictly decreasing. For k = 1, the density function tends to 1/λ as x approaches zero from above and is strictly decreasing. For k > 1, the density function tends to zero as x approaches zero from above, increases until its mode and decreases after it. The density function has infinite negative slope at x = 0 if 0 < k < 1, infinite positive slope at x = 0 if 1 < k < 2 and null slope at x = 0 if k > 2. For k = 1 the density has a finite negative slope at x = 0. For k = 2 the density has a finite positive slope at x = 0. As k goes to infinity, the Weibull distribution converges to a Dirac delta distribution centered at x = λ. Moreover, the skewness and coefficient of variation depend only on the shape parameter. A generalization of the Weibull distribution is the hyperbolastic distribution of type III.

Cumulative distribution function

The cumulative distribution function for the Weibull distribution is

for x ≥ 0, and F(x; k; λ) = 0 for x < 0.

If x = λ then F(x; k; λ) = 1 − e−1 ≈ 0.632 for all values of k. Vice versa: at F(x; k; λ) = 0.632 the value of x ≈ λ.

The quantile (inverse cumulative distribution) function for the Weibull distribution is

for 0 ≤ p < 1.

The failure rate h (or hazard function) is given by

The Mean time between failures MTBF is

Moments
The moment generating function of the logarithm of a Weibull distributed random variable is given by

where  is the gamma function. Similarly, the characteristic function of log X is given by

In particular, the nth raw moment of X is given by

The mean and variance of a Weibull random variable can be expressed as

and

The skewness is given by

where , which may also be written as  

The excess kurtosis is given by

where . The kurtosis excess may also be written as:

Moment generating function
A variety of expressions are available for the moment generating function of X itself. As a power series, since the raw moments are already known, one has

Alternatively, one can attempt to deal directly with the integral

If the parameter k is assumed to be a rational number, expressed as k = p/q where p and q are integers, then this integral can be evaluated analytically. With t replaced by −t, one finds

where G is the Meijer G-function.

Reparametrization tricks 

 
 .

Shannon entropy
The information entropy is given by

where  is the Euler–Mascheroni constant. The Weibull distribution is the maximum entropy distribution for a non-negative real random variate with a fixed expected value of xk equal to λk and a fixed expected value of ln(xk) equal to ln(λk) − .

Parameter estimation

Maximum likelihood

The maximum likelihood estimator for the  parameter given  is

When  are the  largest observed samples from a dataset of more than  samples,  then the maximum likelihood estimator for the  parameter given  is

Kullback–Leibler divergence 
The Kullback–Leibler divergence between two Weibulll distributions is given by

Weibull plot

The fit of a Weibull distribution to data can be visually assessed using a Weibull plot. The Weibull plot is a plot of the empirical cumulative distribution function  of data on special axes in a type of Q–Q plot. The axes are  versus . The reason for this change of variables is the cumulative distribution function can be linearized:

which can be seen to be in the standard form of a straight line. Therefore, if the data came from a Weibull distribution then a straight line is expected on a Weibull plot.

Linear regression can also be used to numerically assess goodness of fit and estimate the parameters of the Weibull distribution. The gradient informs one directly about the shape parameter  and the scale parameter  can also be inferred.

Applications
The Weibull distribution is used

 In survival analysis
 In reliability engineering and failure analysis
 In electrical engineering to represent overvoltage occurring in an electrical system
 In industrial engineering to represent manufacturing and delivery times
 In extreme value theory
 In weather forecasting and the wind power industry to describe wind speed distributions, as the natural distribution often matches the Weibull shape
 In communications systems engineering
 In radar systems to model the dispersion of the received signals level produced by some types of clutters
 To model fading channels in wireless communications, as the Weibull fading model seems to exhibit good fit to experimental fading channel measurements
 In information retrieval to model dwell times on web pages.
 In general insurance to model the size of reinsurance claims, and the cumulative development of asbestosis losses
 In forecasting technological change (also known as the Sharif-Islam model)
 In hydrology the Weibull distribution is applied to extreme events such as annual maximum one-day rainfalls and river discharges.
 In decline curve analysis to model oil production rate curve of shale oil wells.
 In describing the size of particles generated by grinding, milling and crushing operations, the 2-Parameter Weibull distribution is used, and in these applications it is sometimes known as the Rosin–Rammler distribution. In this context it predicts fewer fine particles than the log-normal distribution and it is generally most accurate for narrow particle size distributions.
 In calculating the rate of radiation-induced single event effects onboard spacecraft, a four-parameter Weibull distribution is used to fit experimentally measured device cross section probability data to a particle linear energy transfer spectrum. The Weibull fit was originally used because of a belief that particle energy levels align to a statistical distribution, but this belief was later proven false and the Weibull fit continues to be used because of its many adjustable parameters, rather than a demonstrated physical basis.

Related distributions
 A Weibull distribution is a generalized gamma distribution with both shape parameters equal to k.
 The translated Weibull distribution (or 3-parameter Weibull) contains an additional parameter. When , this reduces to the 2-parameter distribution.
 The Weibull distribution can be characterized as the distribution of a random variable  such that the random variable  is the standard exponential distribution with intensity 1.
Note that  here is equivalent to  just above. This leads to an easily implemented numerical scheme for simulating a Weibull distribution.
 The Weibull distribution interpolates between the exponential distribution with intensity  when  and a Rayleigh distribution of mode  when .
 The Weibull distribution (usually sufficient in reliability engineering) is a special case of the three parameter exponentiated Weibull distribution where the additional exponent equals 1. The exponentiated Weibull distribution accommodates unimodal, bathtub shaped and monotone failure rates.
 The Weibull distribution is a special case of the generalized extreme value distribution. It was in this connection that the distribution was first identified by Maurice Fréchet in 1927. The closely related Fréchet distribution, named for this work, has the probability density function 
 The distribution of a random variable that is defined as the minimum of several random variables, each having a different Weibull distribution, is a poly-Weibull distribution.
It is widely used in mineral processing to describe particle size distributions in comminution processes. In this context the cumulative distribution is given by  where
  is the particle size
  is the 80th percentile of the particle size distribution
  is a parameter describing the spread of the distribution
 Because of its availability in spreadsheets, it is also used where the underlying behavior is actually better modeled by an Erlang distribution.
 If  then  (Exponential distribution)
 For the same values of k, the Gamma distribution takes on similar shapes, but the Weibull distribution is more platykurtic.

  From the viewpoint of the Stable count distribution,  can be regarded as Lévy's stability parameter.

See also
 Fisher–Tippett–Gnedenko theorem
 Logistic distribution
 Rosin–Rammler distribution for particle size analysis
 Rayleigh distribution
 Stable count distribution

References

Bibliography
.

.

.

External links
 
 Mathpages – Weibull analysis
 The Weibull Distribution
 Reliability Analysis with Weibull
 Interactive graphic: Univariate Distribution Relationships
 Online Weibull Probability Plotting

Continuous distributions
Survival analysis
Exponential family distributions
Extreme value data